Provincial Road 266 (PR 266), is a provincial road in the Canadian province of Manitoba.

Route description 
Provincial Road 266 starts on the east side of the village of Bowsman at PTH 10 and close to PR 279. The route leads to Birch River. It is an alternative route to PTH 10. The first part of the road near Bowsman follows along the Woody River, then it travels straight north. In Birch River it joins up with PR 268, about a mile from PTH 10. It is almost entirely a gravel road, except for the paved sections within Bowsman and Birch River.

266